In computer networking, a mangled or invalid packet is a packet — especially IP packet — that either lacks order or self-coherence, or contains code aimed to confuse or disrupt computers, firewalls, routers, or any service present on the network.

Their usage is associated with a type of network attack called a denial-of-service (DoS) attack. They aim to destabilize the network and sometimes to reveal its available services – when network operators must restart the disabled ones. Mangled packets can be generated by dedicated software such as nmap. 

, most invalid packets are easily filtered by modern stateful firewalls.

References

Packets (information technology)